(), sometimes referred as Propitious pouch in English, is generic term used to refer to Chinese embroidery pouches, purses, or small bag. In everyday life,  are used to store items. In present-days China,  are still valued traditional gifts or token of fortune.  are also used in Traditional Chinese medicine.

There are many ethnic groups in China which share the custom of wearing pouches. Manchu pouches are called .

Terminology 
While the wearing of Chinese pouches can be traced back to the Pre-Qin dynasties or much earlier, the term of  only appeared after the Song dynasty.

Cultural significance

Token of love 
 is also used as token of love since purses were personal items. They are used as a gift between young girls and boys and their acceptance towards each other. Chinese perfume pouches, are still valued items which are exchanged between lovers in the countryside.

Perfume pouches are also a love token for the ethnic Manchu; and when two youths fall in love, the boy is given a handmade perfume pouch by the girl. It is unknown when the perfume pouch became a pledge of romantic love. In Manchu culture, the pouch can also hold tobacco. Tobacco pouches are usually made by a wife for her husband or by a maiden for her lover.

It is also customary for the brides from the Yunnan ethnic minorities to sew  in advance prior to their wedding; they would then bring  to their bridegroom's home when they get married. The number of  they would require to make would depend on the numbers of people (e.g. musicians, singers and guests) who would attend their wedding ceremony. Ginkgo nuts, peanuts, sweets would be placed inside those pouches as a symbolism of 'giving birth to babies as soon as possible'.

Perfume pouches against the Five poisons 
These perfume sachets are called .

Medical usage 
 is used in Traditional Chinese medicine. The wearing of Chinese medicine  as a preventive to diseases are a characteristic of Traditional Chinese medicine, known as dressing therapy. These medicine pouches are used to induce resuscitation, awaken consciousness, eliminate turbid pathogens with aromatics, invigorate organs (spleen and stomach), avoid plague and filth, repel mosquitoes and other insects.

History

The custom of wearing of pouches dates back to the pre-Qin dynasties period or earlier; the earliest unearthed artefacts of Chinese pouches is one dating from the Spring and Autumn period and the Warring States period.

In the Southern and Northern dynasties,  became one of the most popular form of clothing adornment. They were worn at the waist and were used to carry items (such as seals, keys, handkerchiefs).

In the Song dynasty, the term  referred to a small bag which would store carry-on valuables (e.g. money and personal seal). Since then, the custom of wearing  continued throughout the centuries through the late Qing dynasty and the early Republic of China. It then vanished in cities due to the clothing reforms when pockets became of common use.

Chinese perfume pouches/ / /  

The tradition of carrying  can be traced back to the Duanwu festival, where a  would be filled with fragrant herbs and was embroidered with the patterns of the Five Poisons; it was meant to ward off evil spirits and wickedness while brings wealth and auspiciousness to its carrier. According to old sayings, these perfume pouches were made to commemorate Qu Yuan: when Qu Yuan drowned himself in the Miluo River, people living in the neighbouring Qin made and carried pouches stuffed with sweet grass and perfumed which was loved by Qu Yuan out of sympathy for the poet and to cherish his memory.

During the reign of Qin Shi Huang, perfume pouches were attached on the girdles of young men to show respect to their parents and their in-laws.

By the Qing dynasty,  were not exclusively used on the Duanwu Festival; they were used on daily basis. Nearly everyone carried a  regardless of social classes, ages and gender. The Manchu also carried  all year round. The Qing emperors would also award perfume pouches to the princes and ministers to show his favour for them on important festivals or at the end of each year. , ornamented purses which were manufactured for the imperial palace, were an extraordinary mark of imperial favour and expressed the high regards which was held by the Qing emperor to his generals; the emperors only sent to those hebao to his highest generals.

Manchu pouch/  
The  of the Manchu people originated from a form of bag used by the ancestors of the Manchu who lived a hunting life through dense forested mountains. The bag was originally made of out animal hide and was worn at the waist; it was secured on the belt for the usage of carry food. Later on, when the ancestors of the Manchu left the mountain regions and began an agricultural life, the hide bag was developed into a small and delicate accessory which would only contain sweetmeat. Manchu women would use small pieces of silk and satin to the sew the bag and would decorate it with flower and birds embroidery patterns. They also use their pouches to carry perfume and tobacco.

Construction and design 

 is a bag composed of 2 sides: the interior and exterior side. It is often embroidered on its outside while the inside is made of a thick layer of fabric. The opening of the bag is threaded with a silk string that can tightened and loosened. They are made in various shapes, such as rotund, oblong, peach, ruyi, and guava. They also have different patterns for different usages (e.g. butterflies and flowers represented the wish for love and marriage; golden melons and children represented the wishes for longevity and more children; images of  represented the wishes for carrying a son).

Manchu's tobacco pouch 
The Manchu people's tobacco pouch is tied with a small wooden gourd which is carved with rich patterns. The gourd acts primarily as a fastener to prevent its carrier from losing his pouch, by making it harder for the fastener to slip from the seam between the waist and the cloth belt which was used by the Manchu people in the past.

() were the ornamented purses made for the imperial palace and were bestowed to the highest generals favoured by the Emperor in the Qing dynasty as a symbol of favour and high regards. They usually came into 2 sizes: either large or small. They could be bestowed as a single purse, in pairs, or in numbers up to 4.

Ways of wearing

Manchu ethnic 
Manchu people regardless of gender wore pouches, but they wore it differently according to their gender. Men wore their pouches at the waist while women tied their pouches to the 2nd buttons of their traditional Manchu dress, .

Popular culture

Literature and stories 
In reality, Baoyu treasured the  so much that he would have never given it away.

Music and songs 
, originally called  from the regions of Hunan and Guangdong, is a popular song since the Ming and Qing dynasties. Chinese folks about embroidering hebao are sung in all parts of China, with the most familiar ones being the ones in Shanxi, Yunnan, and Sichuan.

Similar items 

 Qiedai - Eggplant-shaped purses worn by imperial officials in ancient China.
 Qingyang sachet
 Sachet
 Yudai - Fish-shaped tally bag; a pouch used in ancient China as a form of yufu (fish tally).

See also 

 Hanfu
 List of hanfu
 List of hanfu accessories

Notes

References 

Chinese traditional clothing
Chinese art
Chinese folk art